Stanislav Ledinek (26 June 1920 – 30 March 1969) was a German film actor. He appeared in more than 90 films between 1953 and 1968. He died in Istanbul, Turkey.

Selected filmography

 Such a Charade (1953)
 Red Roses, Red Lips, Red Wine (1953)
 Life Begins at Seventeen (1953)
 Confession Under Four Eyes (1954)
 My Sister and I (1954)
 The Spanish Fly (1955)
 One Woman Is Not Enough? (1955)
 The Tour Guide of Lisbon (1956)
 The Girl from Flanders (1956)
 Victor and Victoria (1957)
 Stresemann (1957)
 It Happened Only Once (1958)
 Peter Voss, Hero of the Day (1959)
 The Blue Sea and You (1959)
 Nick Knatterton’s Adventure (1959)
 A Thousand Stars Aglitter (1959)
 Every Day Isn't Sunday (1959)
 We Will Never Part (1960)
 Auf Wiedersehen (1961)
 Beloved Impostor (1961)
 The Last of Mrs. Cheyney (1961)
 The Gypsy Baron (1962)
  (1962)
  (1963)
 Piccadilly Zero Hour 12 (1963)
 The Squeaker (1963)
 The Phantom of Soho (1964)
 (1966)
 Love Nights in the Taiga (1967)
  (1967, TV miniseries)

References

External links

1920 births
1969 deaths
German male film actors
20th-century German male actors
Place of birth missing